Amilpas may refer to:

San Jacinto Amilpas, Oaxaca
Santa Cruz Amilpas, Oaxaca
Zacualpan de Amilpas, Morelos